Vichot is a surname. Notable people with the surname include:

Arthur Vichot (born 1988), French cyclist
Frédéric Vichot (born 1959), French cyclist